The Bitter End Yacht Club is a British Virgin Islands resort located in the protected North Sound of Virgin Gorda.  Founded in 1969, the resort is only accessible by boat. 

The resort was destroyed in 2017 by Hurricane Irma and Hurricane Maria but has since rebuilt.

References

External links

1969 establishments in the British Empire
Yacht clubs in North America
Virgin Gorda
Water transport in the British Virgin Islands
Yacht clubs in the United Kingdom